The Belgian National League was the second level of ice hockey in Belgium. The league was one rank below the Belgian Hockey League, but for the 2012-2013 season it was merged with two teams of the defunct North Sea Cup to become the "Belgian Elite League", which is now Belgium's top level league.

Participating teams
 Antwerp Phantoms
 Bulldogs Liège
 Charleroi Red Roosters
 Gullegem Jets
 Haskey Hasselt
 HYC Herentals
 IHC Leuven
 Olympia Heist op den Berg
 White Caps Turnhout
 Yeti Bears Eeklo

External links
Royal Belgian Ice Hockey Federation

2
belg